"Bang and Blame" is a song by American alternative rock group R.E.M. It was released as the second single from their ninth studio album, Monster (1994), on October 31, 1994. The song was R.E.M.'s last to reach the top 40 on the US Billboard Hot 100, peaking at number 19, and was also their last number-one single on the Billboard Modern Rock Tracks chart. The single reached number one in Canada—R.E.M.'s only single to do so—and peaked inside the top 40 on the charts of Australia, Belgium, Finland, Iceland, Ireland, the Netherlands, New Zealand, and the United Kingdom.

"Bang and Blame" was not included on In Time: The Best of R.E.M. 1988–2003 and Part Lies, Part Heart, Part Truth, Part Garbage 1982–2011.

Critical reception
Steve Baltin from Cash Box named "Bang and Blame" Pick of the Week, viewing it as "one of the strongest tracks on the entire album." He added, "A hard-edged guitar tune, vocalist Michael Stipe gets one of his best moments of Monster when he sings, “You kiss on me/don't kiss on me/you tug on me don't tug on me.” The propulsive rhythm of this track should also prove enticing even to non-fans of the group." Fell and Rufer from the Gavin Report felt that "Stipe's angst bites the hand that used to feed it. "Bang and Blame" seems to be the result of some bad kiss 'n' tell. His genius as an oblique lyricist is most of his charm. The arrangment adds to the drama and makes it almost irresistable. Hot A/C will eat this one for lunch." Neil Spencer from The Observer wrote that on tracks such as "Bang and Blame", "there are bursts of the musical invention and humanist outlook that characterises their best work."

Track listings
All songs were written by Bill Berry, Peter Buck, Mike Mills, and Michael Stipe. All live tracks were recorded at the 40 Watt Club, Athens, Georgia, on November 19, 1992. The performance, a benefit for Greenpeace, was recorded on a solar-powered mobile studio.

 US 7-inch, cassette, and CD single
 "Bang and Blame" – 4:48
 "Bang and Blame" (instrumental version) – 4:48

 UK 7-inch and cassette single
 "Bang and Blame" (album version) – 4:48
 "Bang and Blame" (K version) – 4:58

 UK, European, Australian, and Japanese CD single
 "Bang and Blame" (album version)  – 4:48
 "Losing My Religion" (live) – 4:33
 "Country Feedback" (live) – 4:12
 "Begin the Begin" (live) – 3:26

Charts

Weekly charts

Year-end charts

In popular culture
"Bang and Blame" was featured in the Cold Case episode "Blackout" as well as in the Danish mini-series "Charlot og Charlotte" by Ole Bornedal (director of "Nattevagten"/"The Night Watch"), the My Mad Fat Diary episode "Not I" and the Melrose Place episode "No Strings Attached".  The song was also used in "Weird Al" Yankovic's polka medley "The Alternative Polka" from his 1996 album Bad Hair Day.

References

1994 singles
1994 songs
Black-and-white music videos
R.E.M. songs
RPM Top Singles number-one singles
Song recordings produced by Bill Berry
Song recordings produced by Michael Stipe
Song recordings produced by Mike Mills
Song recordings produced by Peter Buck
Song recordings produced by Scott Litt
Songs written by Bill Berry
Songs written by Michael Stipe
Songs written by Mike Mills
Songs written by Peter Buck
Warner Records singles